Dedication is a 2007 American comedy-drama film starring Billy Crudup and Mandy Moore. Written by David Bromberg, this film is actor Justin Theroux's directorial debut. The film premiered at the 2007 Sundance Film Festival. It was produced by Plum Pictures.

Plot
Henry Roth (Billy Crudup) is an obsessive-compulsive and somewhat misanthropic writer of children's books. His illustrator and only friend, Rudy (Tom Wilkinson), dies after a fabulously successful collaboration on their series of children's books about "Marty the Beaver." Henry is under contract to produce another "Marty the Beaver" book for Christmas sales. His publisher, Arthur Planck (Bob Balaban), assigns penniless, lovelorn illustrator Lucy Reilly (Mandy Moore) to work with Henry. She's being wooed by her ex-boyfriend Jeremy (Martin Freeman), who dumped her two years ago but shows up apologetic, having dedicated his new book to her. Lucy and Henry go to their publisher's beach house to work on the book. Will love bloom amid the rocks, or is Henry a bump on Lucy's road to Jeremy? Rudy's voice, from the grave, gives Henry counsel.

Cast
 Tom Wilkinson as Rudy Holt
 Billy Crudup as Henry Roth
 Christine Taylor as Allison
 Bob Balaban as Arthur Planck
 Catherine Lloyd Burns as Mother in Bookstore
 Amy Sedaris as Cassidy's Mom
 Cassidy Hinkle as Cassidy
 Mandy Moore as Lucy Reilly
 Jeremy Shamos as Matthew
 Christopher Fitzgerald as Robin
 Dianne Wiest as Carol
 Jicky Schnee as Mandy the Waitress
 John Ellison Conlee as Man at Lucy's Apartment
 Martin Freeman as Jeremy
 Christopher Grey Misa as Abused Kid
 Catherine Kellner as Abusive Mom
 Bobby Cannavale as Don Meyers
 Peter Bogdanovich as Roger Spade
 Justin Theroux as Lawyer on phone

Production
Filmed in the New York City, Wantagh, and Glen Cove. Gay pornographic actor Erik Rhodes filmed a cameo role for the film but his scenes were ultimately edited out.

Release
The film opened on August 24, 2007 in two theaters, earning an average of $5,958 per theater.

It added two additional theaters the following week, but in its third week (September 7), it left one of the initial screens. Its fourth week also saw the loss of another screen, leaving the film to show in only two theaters (Irvine, CA, Los Angeles, CA) nationwide.

However, in its fifth week, September 21, the film was added to 6 additional theaters (in Palm Desert, CA, San Francisco, CA, Seattle, WA, Chicago, IL, Royal Oak, MI, Washington DC, Philadelphia, PA, Cambridge, MA) marking the largest theater count it had at one point during its run.

The sixth week, September 28, the film lost two theaters, leaving 6 theaters during its last box office-counting week.

Its seventh week, the film opened in 6 cities (San Diego, CA, Dallas, TX, Indianapolis, IN, Scottsdale, AZ, Portland, OR, Denver, CO) in which it had not previously been shown.

In November and December 2007, the film started being shown in two-day runs in Northern California (Sonora, Davis, Visalia), marking its final theatrical run.

Critical response
The film received mixed reviews from critics. , the film holds a 40% approval rating on the review aggregator Rotten Tomatoes, based on 45 reviews with an average rating of 5.18/10. The website's critics consensus reads: "Mandy Moore and Billy Crudup's lack of chemistry in Dedication makes it hard to maintain interest in this confused love story." Metacritic reported the film had an average score of 50 out of 100, based on 19 reviews.

The film was screened at the Sundance Film Festival, and was given its official selection.

DVD release
The film was released on DVD on February 12, 2008 in the United States. The disc has no bonus features.

References

External links

 
 
 
 
 

2007 films
2007 independent films
2007 romantic comedy-drama films
American romantic comedy-drama films
Films scored by Edward Shearmur
Films directed by Justin Theroux
American independent films
2007 directorial debut films
2007 comedy films
2007 drama films
2000s English-language films
2000s American films